Peter Elezovic (born June 28, 1971) is a former American football placekicker who played seven seasons in the Arena Football League with the Albany Firebirds, Chicago Rush, Buffalo Destroyers, Carolina Cobras, Tampa Bay Storm and New York Dragons. He played college football at the University of Michigan. He was also a member of the Washington Redskins, Tampa Bay Buccaneers, Scottish Claymores, Barcelona Dragons and Rhein Fire.

Professional career

Albany Firebirds
Elezovic played for the Albany Firebirds from 1996 to 1998, earning Second Team All-Arena and Kicker of the Year honors in 1996.

Washington Redskins
Elezovic was a member of the Washington Redskins during the 1997 off-season.

Tampa Bay Buccaneers
Elezovic signed with the Tampa Bay Buccaneers in July 1998. He was released by the Buccaneers before the start of the season. He re-signed with the team at the end of the 1998 season. He was leased by the Buccaneers in August 1999.

Washington Redskins
Elezovic was signed by the Washington Redskins during the 2000 off-season. He was allocated to the Scottish Claymores of NFL Europe before being sent to the Barcelona Dragons. He was traded to the Rhein Fire in May 2000. Elezovic was released by the Redskins on July 10 and re-signed by the team on July 28, 2000. He was released by the Redskins on August 22, 2000.

Chicago Rush
Elezovic played for the Chicago Rush during the 2000 season. He was released by the Rush on March 26, 2001.

Buffalo Destroyers
Elezovic was awarded to the Buffalo Destroyers on waivers on March 27, 2001. He was released by the Destroyers on May 1, 2001.

Chicago Rush
Elezovic was awarded to the Chicago Rush on waivers on May 2, 2001.

Carolina Cobras
Elezovic signed with the Carolina Cobras on June 26, 2002. He was released by the Cobras on July 1, 2002.

Tampa Bay Storm
Elezovic was signed by the Tampa Bay Storm on July 25, 2002. He was released by the Storm on February 20, 2003.

New York Dragons
Elezovic signed with the New York Dragons on March 9, 2003. He was released by the Dragons on February 24, 2004.

References

External links
Just Sports Stats
College stats

Living people
1971 births
Players of American football from Detroit
American football placekickers
Michigan Wolverines football players
Albany Firebirds players
Barcelona Dragons players
Rhein Fire players
Chicago Rush players
Buffalo Destroyers players
Carolina Cobras players
Tampa Bay Storm players
New York Dragons players